The UK Singles Chart is a weekly record chart compiled by the Official Charts Company (OCC) on behalf of the British record industry. The chart week runs from Friday to Thursday with the chart date given as the following Thursday.

Audio streaming data was incorporated into the chart in 2014, with 100 streams equivalent to one sale. In 2017, the OCC introduced an exception for songs that had spent a certain time on the charts and whose consumption had declined, whereby these songs are calculated at a rate of 300 streams equivalent to a sale. Ellie Goulding was the first artist to top the chart in the decade, with her cover of Joni Mitchell's song "River".

The following singles have all been number one in the United Kingdom during the 2020s.

Number-one singles

Artists with the most number ones
Three artists have at least two number-one singles during the 2020s.

Songs with the most weeks at number one
The following songs spent at least six weeks at number one during the 2020s.

Artists with the most weeks at number one
The following artists have all spent a total of six or more weeks at the number-one spot during the 2020s.

Record labels with the most weeks at number one
Six record labels have spent nine or more weeks at the top of the UK Singles Chart during the 2020s.

See also
 List of UK Albums Chart number ones of the 2020s

Notes

References

External links
Official UK Singles Top 100 at the Official Charts Company
The Official UK Top 40 Singles Chart at BBC Radio 1

2020s
United Kingdom Singles
2020s in British music